Aonbaw is a village in Lahe Township, Naga Self-Administered Zone, in the Sagaing Region of northwestern Burma. It is located in the Naga Hills, to the north of Lahe. Human sacrifice and headhunting has been documented in the Lahe Township.

References

External links
Maplandia World Gazetteer

Populated places in Naga Self-Administered Zone
Lahe Township